Darbhanga Planetarium is Bihar's second planetarium/science museum (also known as Taramandal). It was built in Kadirabad Polytechnic Ground,Darbhanga in the Indianstate of Bihar.

History
The planetarium was built on a 21,000 square meter area with a budget of ₹92.8 crore in its first phase. A total budget of 164 crore rupees was announced for construction work in 2018. The first phase was completed by December 2022.

Planetarium features
The design was prepared by US architectural firm Chelsea West Architects. This planetarium has 150 seats. The auditorium has 300 seats. An orientation hall with 50 seats has been built. The planetarium has three shapes: elliptical, spherical, and dome-shaped. The dome size is 14 meters. The content is to be 3D.

A solar parking pathway, cafeteria, lobby, science gallery, service building, and lotus pond are included..

Planetarium timing
On the second day of inauguration, on January 13, 2023, a special show was presented on the orders of Darbhanga District Magistrate. People were informed about the position of planets, constellations and astronomical events in the solar system.

References

External links
 Darbhanga Planetarium (दरभंगा तारामंडल) on YouTube

2023 establishments in India
Buildings and structures completed in 2022
Museums established in 2023
Planetaria in India
Science museums in India
Tourist attractions in Darbhanga district
Darbhanga